Kharaba also spelled Kharraba or Kherba, is a village in southeastern Syria, administratively part of the as-Suwayda District of the as-Suwayda Governorate but very close to Daraa Governorate, located southwest of as-Suwayda between as-Suwayda and Daraa.. In the 2004 census, it had a population of 581. Its inhabitants are predominantly Greek Orthodox Christians.

References

Bibliography

Eastern Orthodox Christian communities in Syria
Populated places in as-Suwayda District